Mònica Terribas i Sala (born January 16, 1968 in Barcelona) is a Spanish journalist and professor at the University Pompeu Fabra. Between 2008 and 2012 she was director of Televisió de Catalunya and the following year, councillor delegated and publisher of the Ara newspaper. Since 2 September 2013 she has directed El matí de Catalunya Ràdio.

References 

Living people
1968 births
Spanish women journalists
Journalists from Catalonia
Academic staff of Pompeu Fabra University
21st-century journalists